The ICC Cricket Hall of Fame recognises "the achievements of the legends of the game from cricket's long and illustrious history". It was launched by the International Cricket Council (ICC) in Dubai on 2 January 2009, in association with the Federation of International Cricketers' Associations (FICA), as part of the ICC's centenary celebrations. The initial inductees were the 55 players included in the FICA Hall of Fame which ran from 1999 to 2003, but further members are added each year during the ICC Awards ceremony. The inaugural inductees ranged from W. G. Grace, who retired from Test cricket in 1899, to Graham Gooch, who played his last Test match in 1995. Living inductees receive a commemorative cap; Australian Rod Marsh was the first member of the initial inductees to receive his. Members of the Hall of Fame assist in the selection of future inductees.

South African Barry Richards played the fewest Test matches during his career with four, before South Africa were excluded from participating in international cricket in 1970. Indian Sachin Tendulkar, inducted in July 2019, played the most Tests with 200 in an international career spanning 24 years. Out of 109 inductees in the ICC Cricket Hall of Fame, 82 are from England, Australia and the West Indies, while the other 27 inductees are from the remaining Test playing nations, India, New Zealand, Pakistan, South Africa, Sri Lanka and Zimbabwe.

There are eleven women in the Hall of Fame. In 2010, Rachael Heyhoe Flint, the former England captain who led her team to victory at the inaugural Women's World Cup in 1973, became the first woman in the Hall of Fame; the ten other female members are Belinda Clark, inducted in 2011, Enid Bakewell, inducted in 2012, Debbie Hockley, inducted in 2013, Betty Wilson, inducted in 2015, Karen Rolton, inducted in 2016, Claire Taylor, inducted in 2018, Cathryn Fitzpatrick, inducted in 2019 Lisa Sthalekar, inducted in 2020, Jan Brittin, inducted in 2021, and Charlotte Edwards inducted in 2022.

Inductees

By team

See also
Australian Cricket Hall of Fame
Wisden Cricketers of the Century
Six Giants of the Wisden Century

References
General

Specific

External links
ICC Cricket Hall of Fame official website
List of ICC Cricket Hall of Famers

Cricket museums and halls of fame
Hall of fame
Organisations based in Dubai
Halls of fame in the United Arab Emirates
Awards established in 2009
Cricket in the United Arab Emirates
2009 establishments in the United Arab Emirates